Cifellilestes is a genus of early mammaliaform from the Late Jurassic Morrison Formation of North America. The type and only species, C. ciscoensis, was named in 2022 by Brian M. Davis and colleagues, and was found in the Cisco Mammal Quarry of Utah. The generic name of the animal is in honor of Richard Cifelli, combined with the Greek word "lestes", which means thief. The specific name refers to Cisco, Utah, a ghost town close in close proximity to the location where the holotype was found. The genus is known from two specimens, OMNH 80538 & 69352. These specimens represent a right and left skull fragment respectively, both preserving partial palate, snout and postcanine dentition. It belongs to the clade Morganucodonta.

References 

Morganucodonts
Prehistoric cynodont genera
Tithonian genera
Late Jurassic synapsids of North America
Morrison fauna
Fossil taxa described in 2022
Monotypic prehistoric animal genera